Shiva Sundar Shrestha, known professionally as Shiva Shrestha, is a Nepali actor best known for his work in action films. He is renowned as the "action king" of Nepali cinema. He has starred in many commercially successful films, including Jeevan Rekha (1982), Badalindo Akash (1984), Kanchi (1984), Bishwas (1986), Chino (1989), Manakamana (1991), Milan (1993), Dharma Sankat (1998), and Thuldai (1999), etc. During the 1980s, 1990s, and the early 2000s, he was called the "second pillar" of the film industry because of the hits he has given. 

Shrestha has also acted in Pakistani films; he has acted in over a dozen Urdu films, seven of which were commercially very successful. He made his come back to Nepali cinema in 2016 with the film Bagmati, where he appeared alongside Rajesh Hamal. In 2018, he announced a film, Euta Esto Prem Kahani, which he would write, produce, and star his son Shakti, who would debut through this film. Shrestha was set to feature in a prominent role himself.

Filmography

Nepali films

Pakistani films 
Shrestha has appeared in many Pakistani Urdu films. During his five-year period, his action and dancing skills were popular among Pakistani audiences. The list below represents some of the Pakistani films he appeared in.

References

External links

Living people
20th-century Nepalese male actors
People from Biratnagar
Nepalese male film actors
1954 births